Polleniidae is a family of flies in the order Diptera. There are at least 6 genera and more than 190 described species placed definitively in Polleniidae, and other genera whose placement here is considered uncertain. The largest genus is Pollenia, with close to 190 species of flies commonly called "cluster flies".

The family Polleniidae has been considered a subfamily of Calliphoridae in the past, containing various genera and species. As a result of phylogenetic analysis, the subfamily Polleniinae was elevated to family rank by Cerretti, et al., in 2019, and assigned the genera listed below.

Genera
Alvamaja Rognes, 2010
Dexopollenia Townsend, 1917
Melanodexia Williston, 1893
Morinia Robineau-Desvoidy, 1830
Pollenia Robineau-Desvoidy, 1830 (cluster flies)
Xanthotryxus Aldrich, 1930

Incertae sedis
Anthracomyza Malloch, 1928
Nesodexia Villeneuve, 1911

References

 
Brachycera families